John Kinloch may refer to:

 John Kinloch (post master), 16th-century Scottish post master
 John Kinloch (police officer) (fl. 1857–1872), Scottish police officer
 John Kinloch (cricketer) (1833–1897), Australian cricketer
 Sir John Kinloch, 2nd Baronet (1849–1910), British politician
 John L. Kinloch (1880-1968), Scottish nationalist politician